Anthidium rubripes is a species of bee in the family Megachilidae, the leaf-cutter, carder, or mason bees.

Distribution
Argentina
Bolivia
Chile
Peru

Synonyms
Synonyms for this species include:
Anthidium boliviense Friese, 1920
Anthidium adriani Ruiz, 1935
Anthidium kuscheli Moure, 1957

References

rubripes
Insects described in 1908